The 2021–22 Abilene Christian Wildcats men's basketball team represented Abilene Christian University (ACU) in the 2021–22 NCAA Division I men's basketball season. The Wildcats, led by first-year head coach Brette Tanner, were first-year members of the Western Athletic Conference. Due to renovations at their usual home arena of Moody Coliseum, they played their home games on temporary stands and court set up on the indoor tennis courts of the Teague Special Events Center.

This season was the Wildcats' first season in the WAC. Abilene Christian and three other schools from Texas joined the conference on July 1, 2021 after leaving the Southland Conference.

Previous season
In a season limited due to the ongoing COVID-19 pandemic, the Wildcats finished the 2020–21 season 24–5, 13–2 in Southland play to finish in second place. They received a bye to the semifinals of the Southland tournament where they defeated Lamar and Nicholls to win the tournament championship. As a result, they received the conference's automatic bid to the NCAA tournament as the No. 14 seed in the East region. There the Wildcats upset No. 9-ranked Texas in the first round. They lost to eventual Final Four participant UCLA in the second round.

Roster

Schedule and results

|-
!colspan=12 style=| Non-conference Regular season

|-
!colspan=12 style=| WAC conference season

|-
!colspan=9 style=|WAC tournament

|-
!colspan=9 style=|CBI

Source

See also 
2021–22 Abilene Christian Wildcats women's basketball team

Notes

References

Abilene Christian Wildcats men's basketball seasons
Abilene Christian Wildcats
Abilene Christian Wildcats men's basketball
Abilene Christian Wildcats men's basketball
Abilene Christian